The Magic Goes Away is a fantasy short story written by Larry Niven in 1976, and later expanded to a novella of the same name which was published in 1978. While these works were not the first in the "Magic Universe" or "Warlock" series, they marked a turning point after the 1973 oil crisis and Niven's subsequent transformation of the series into an allegory for a modern-day energy crisis. The setting was later used as a backdrop for the Golden Road series of novels The Burning City and Burning Tower, co-written with Jerry Pournelle, and the novel The Seascape Tattoo co-written with Steven Barnes.

List of works in the series
This is a list of publications based on the setting of The Magic Goes Away.

Plot summary
The Warlock, whose actual name is both unknown and unpronounceable, is a very powerful sorcerer at least 200 years old. He observes that when he stays in one place too long, his powers dwindle and that they return only when he leaves that place. Experimentation leads him to create an apparatus, now known as the Warlock's Wheel, consisting of a metal disc enchanted to spin perpetually. The enchantment eventually consumes all of the mana in the vicinity, which causes a localized failure in all magic. The Warlock realizes that magic is fueled by a non-renewable resource, which would cause great concern among the magicians, as it was through their magic that nations enforced their wills both internally and abroad. The widespread diminishing of magical power in The Magic Goes Away triggered a quest on the part of the most powerful of the magicians of the time to harness a new source of magic, the Moon, which results in the events described in the book.

It was eventually discovered (in The Magic May Return) that mana was originally carried to Earth and the other bodies of the solar system on the solar wind, which replenishes mana slowly over time. However, at some point in the "recent" past (a few thousand years ago) a god created an invisible shield between Earth and Sun that intercepted the solar mana and caused the eventual decline of magic on Earth.

Traditional fantasy creatures inhabit Niven's Magic universe, but devolve into normal animals when deprived of mana. For example, a unicorn becomes a simple horse.

Main characters
 The Warlock: One of the world's foremost magicians.
 Clubfoot: The Warlock's apprentice. A Native American named after a deformity of his foot that he could have cured long ago but at the cost of half his power.
 Wavyhill: The first necromancer. Exploiting the mana inherent in murder, he invented necromancy. His name comes from his practice of building his houses under magically supported overhangs; when the local mana is depleted by a battle, the hillside collapses, trapping his foe and eliminating the evidence at the same time.

Minor characters
 Orolandes: A Greek soldier, survivor of the sinking of Atlantis.
 Mirandee: A powerful witch, formerly Warlock's lover.
 The World Worm: Its spine composes all the world's mountain chains—the Andes, Himalayas, Rockies, etc. It consumes its own tail, along with anything that might be living on it.

Reception
Richard A. Lupoff reviewed the 1978 novella unfavorably, saying that although the story "bristles with amusing devices", the writing itself was unsatisfactory: "Niven doesn't make any of it real for me; there's hardly a spark of humanity in the book. ... [Niven uses] flat, dull, sterile narrative prose".

Influences
In her afterword to the novella, Sandra Miesel identified a number of influences on the setting: "The Wheels of If", The Incomplete Enchanter, The Blue Star, Operation Chaos, Too Many Magicians, The Dragon and the George, as well as Niven's earlier works, "All the Myriad Ways" and the Svetz series.

There are also several references to the works of H. P. Lovecraft, such as the reference of a mad magician named Alhazred and an amorphous god called the Crawling Chaos.

Graphic novel adaptation
The Magic Goes Away was adapted as a graphic novel, the sixth in the DC Science Fiction Graphic Novel series, by Paul Kupperberg and Jan Duursema in 1986.

In popular culture
These card games use a card called "Nevinyrral" ("Larry Niven" spelled backwards), which reference elements from The Magic Goes Away:

 The collectible card game Magic: The Gathering (by Richard Garfield) has a card called "Nevinyrral's Disk", which is a reference to the Warlock's Wheel. This card roughly has the effect of removing the effects of players' spells from play, while leaving their lands intact.
 The collectible card game Netrunner (also by Richard Garfield) has a card called "Nevinyrral", which has the effect of giving the Corporate player an extra action each turn, but if this card goes away the Corporate player loses.

References

External links 
 The short story: 
 The novel: 

1976 short stories
1978 American novels
1978 science fiction novels
Ace Books books
American novellas
American fantasy novels
Fantasy short stories
Novels by Larry Niven
Short stories by Larry Niven